Woodford's scaly-toed gecko (Lepidodactylus woodfordi) is a species of lizard in the family Gekkonidae. The species is native to Papua New Guinea and the Solomon Islands.

Etymology
The specific name, woodfordi, is in honor of British naturalist Charles Morris Woodford.

Reproduction
L. woodfordi is oviparous.

References

Further reading
Boulenger GA (1887). "Second Contribution to the Herpetology of the Solomon Islands". Proceedings of the Zoological Society of London 1887: 333–338 + Plate XXVIII. (Lepidodactylus woodfordi, new species, p. 334 + Plate XXVIII, figures 1, 1a).
de Rooij N (1915). The Reptiles of the Indo-Australian Archipelago. I. Lacertilia, Chelonia, Emydosauria. Leiden: E.J. Brill. xiv + 384 pp. (Lepidodactylus woodfordi, p. 51).
Rösler H (2000). "Kommentierte Liste der rezent, subrezent und fossil bekannten Geckotaxa (Reptilia: Gekkonomorpha)". Gekkota 2: 28–153. (Lepidodactylus woodfordi, p. 91). (in German).

Lepidodactylus
Reptiles of Papua New Guinea
Reptiles of the Solomon Islands
Reptiles described in 1887
Taxa named by George Albert Boulenger